Punta Peuco Prison (Penal de Punta Peuco), officially El Centro de Detención Preventiva y Cumplimiento Penitenciario Especial Punta Peuco, is a prison located in the municipality of Tiltil, Santiago Metropolitan Region. Punta Peuco is a special facility specifically built in 1995 for individuals convicted of crimes against humanity and human rights abuses during the Military dictatorship of Chile (1973–90). The prison, which holds approximately 70 inmates, is considerably more modern than a standard Chilean jail. After considerable military protest and insubordination in response to the sentences against violations of the human rights, Punta Peuco was built within a military community, but the prison is administered by the Chilean Gendarmerie, the national prison service, similar to the country's other prisons.

In June and October of 1995, convicted Caravan of Death commanders Manuel Contreas and Pedro Espinoza were incarcerated at the prison, respectively. 22 July 1995 some 1,500 people, many of them members of the army, attended a rally outside the Punta Peuco prison in solidarity for Brigadier Espinoza. Inmates have included Manuel Contreras, Raúl Iturriaga, Pedro Espinoza and Marcelo Moren Brito.

Inmates
 Manuel Contreras
 Pedro Espinoza
 Álvaro Corbalán
 Miguel Krassnoff
 Jorge del Río
 Marcelo Moren Brito
 José Zara Holger
 César Manríquez
 Hugo Salas Wenzel
 Carlos Herrera Jiménez
 Guillermo González Betancourt
 Juan Fuentes Castro
 Claudio Salazar Fuentes
 Alejandro Saez Mardones
 Patricio Zamora Rodríguez
 Manuel Muñoz Gamboa
 Fernando Valdés Cid
 Fernando Torres Silva

References

Prisons in Chile
Military dictatorship of Chile (1973–1990)
Buildings and structures in Santiago Metropolitan Region